
Loman is a surname.  Notable people with the surname include:

Abraham Dirk Loman (1823-1897), Dutch theologian
Berger Loman (1886–1968), US Army soldier awarded the Medal of Honor for his actions in World War I
Bram Lomans (born 1975), Dutch field hockey player
Dorine Loman (born 1960), Dutch cricketer
Doug Loman (born 1959), American retired baseball player
Harry Loman (c.1881–aft.1973), British stage performer and comic
Jamai Loman (born 1986), Dutch pop singer, winner of the first series of Idols, the Dutch variant of Pop Idol
Judy Loman (born 1936), American-Canadian harpist and harp teacher
Madeleine Loman (born 1967), Dutch cricketer
Rudolf Loman (1861-1932), Dutch chess master, son of Abraham Dirk Loman
Rupert Loman (born 1983), British co-founder (with brother Nick) and current CEO of Gamer Network
Teuvo Loman (born 1962), Finnish hairdresser, model, fashion designer and singer
Boris Loman (born 1988), Digital marketing manager, Belgrade, Serbia

Fictional characters include:
Willy Loman, protagonist of the 1949 play Death of a Salesman by Arthur Miller
David Loman, titular character of a 2013 Taiwanese movie

See also
 (born 1985), Dutch-Austrian musical and film actor
Justin Loomans (born 1975), Australian rugby player

Dutch-language surnames